The 2014 Coupe Banque Nationale was a tennis tournament played on indoor carpet courts. It was the 22nd edition of the Tournoi de Québec and the first with National Bank of Canada as the main sponsor, and was part of the WTA International tournaments of the 2014 WTA Tour. It took place at the PEPS de l'Université Laval in Quebec City, Canada, from September 8 through September 14, 2014.

Points and prize money

Point distribution

Prize money

Singles main draw entrants

Seeds

1 Rankings are as of August 25, 2014

Other entrants
The following players received wildcards into the singles main draw:
 Françoise Abanda
 Stéphanie Dubois
 Venus Williams

The following player entered the singles main draw with a protected ranking:
 Tatjana Maria

The following players received entry from the qualifying draw:
 Samantha Crawford
 Barbora Krejčíková
 Sanaz Marand
 Tereza Martincová
 Asia Muhammad
 Olga Savchuk

Withdrawals
Before the tournament
 Julia Boserup → replaced by  Alizé Lim
 Marina Erakovic → replaced by  Andrea Hlaváčková
 Claire Feuerstein → replaced by  Sachia Vickery
 Madison Keys → replaced by  Romina Oprandi
 Allie Kiick → replaced by  Lucie Hradecká
 Aleksandra Wozniak (right shoulder injury) → replaced by  Paula Kania

Doubles main draw entrants

Seeds

1 Rankings are as of August 25, 2014

Other entrants
The following pairs received wildcards into the doubles main draw:
 Ayan Broomfield /  Maria Patrascu
 Sonja Molnar /  Charlotte Petrick

Champions

Singles

 Mirjana Lučić-Baroni def.  Venus Williams, 6–4, 6–3

Doubles

 Lucie Hradecká /  Mirjana Lučić-Baroni def.  Julia Görges /  Andrea Hlaváčková, 6–3, 7–6(10–8)

References

External links
Official website

Coupe Banque Nationale
Tournoi de Québec
Coupe Banque Nationale
Coupe Banque Nationale
2010s in Quebec City